This is a list of episodes for the television sitcom The Joey Bishop Show, which was broadcast on NBC for three seasons and then moved to CBS for its fourth and final season.

Series overview

Season 1 (1961–62)
Most of season 1 episodes were broadcast in black-and-white.

Season 2 (1962–63)
All season 2 episodes were broadcast in color.

Season 3 (1963–64)
All season 3 episodes were broadcast in color.

Season 4 (1964–65)
All season 4 episodes were broadcast in black-and-white for this final season on CBS.

References

External links
 

Lists of American comedy television series episodes
Lists of American sitcom episodes